The Benjamin Bangs House is a single-family home located at 819 South Leroy Street in Fenton, Michigan. It was listed on the National Register of Historic Places in 1982.

History
Benjamin Bangs was the first village president of what was then Fentonville, elected in 1863. He built this fine house for his family in about 1866. In later years, the house served as a tea room, corset shop, and radio station at various times.

Description
The Benjamin Bangs House is a two-story frame rectangular Greek Revival with a gable roof and one hip-roofed side wing. The front facade contains a door framed with pilasters and topped with a fanlight-like molding and a full entablature. The gable end terminates in a wide modillioned frieze below a boxed cornice with returns.

References

		
National Register of Historic Places in Genesee County, Michigan
Greek Revival architecture in Michigan
Residential buildings completed in 1863